Guy Lassausaie (birth 9 March 1961) is a French chef based in Chasselay, Rhône, France. His restaurant has two Michelin stars. He was awarded as Meilleur Ouvrier de France in 1993.

References

1961 births
Head chefs of Michelin starred restaurants
French chefs
French restaurateurs
Living people
Chefs from Lyon